Garcinia afzelii is a species of small to medium tree in the family Clusiaceae. It is found in Cameroon, Central African Republic, Gabon and Guinea. It is sometimes called "bitter kola", but this name properly refers to G. kola.

It is endemic to tropical forests of West Africa.

References

afzelii
Trees of Africa
Flora of Cameroon
Flora of the Central African Republic
Flora of Gabon
Flora of Guinea
Vulnerable plants
Taxonomy articles created by Polbot